The second season of Reba, an American television sitcom series, aired on The WB from September 20, 2002 to May 9, 2003. The season consisted of 25 episodes. 

The show was broadcast during 2002–03 television season on Fridays at 9 pm. The season averaged higher ratings than the first season with 4.5 million viewers. The entire season was released on DVD in North America on December 13, 2005.

Main Cast
 Reba McEntire as Reba Hart
 Christopher Rich as Brock Hart
 Melissa Peterman as Barbara Jean Hart
 JoAnna Garcia as Cheyenne Montgomery
 Steve Howey as Van Montgomery
 Scarlett Pomers as Kyra Hart
 Mitch Holleman as Jake Hart

Episodes

Home media

References

2002 American television seasons
2003 American television seasons
Reba (TV series) seasons